Edwin Wallace Williams (born November 26, 1926) is an American actor, who played Ted Olsen on the TV series Police Squad! and in The Naked Gun films.

Williams was a broadcasting and speech teacher at Los Angeles City College in Southern California. He retired and then took acting classes. With the help of some contacts, he started acting as a second career.

Despite the success of The Naked Gun films, Williams only had minor roles in other movies, such as The Giant of Thunder Mountain (1991) and Carnosaur (1993).

Filmography

References

External links 
 
 

1926 births
Living people
American male film actors
American male television actors